The 1994 Tour of Britain was the eighth edition of the Kellogg's Tour of Britain cycle race and was held from 8 August to 12 August 1994. The race started in Glasgow and finished in Manchester. The race was won by Maurizio Fondriest of the Lampre team.

Route

General classification

References

Further reading

1994
Tour of Britain
Tour of Britain
August 1994 sports events in Europe